A barrel barbecue is a type of barbecue made from a 55-gallon barrel. Vents are cut into the top and bottom for airflow control. A lid is used to retain heat. A chimney is not needed because the length of the barrel acts as its own chimney and provides a draft. Short horseshoe-like legs are attached for stability.

Barrel barbecues are not to be confused with barrel barbecue stoves. These are cut in half lengthwise, where one half acts as the cooking surface and the other half is attached by hinges and acts as the cover.

The barrel barbecue has been used at various functions for about 10 years now. It is commonly used during the World of Outlaws car races to cook for racers.

Construction 

Because this is a "Homemade Smoker" it can be built different ways, using different materials.

A barrel barbecue stands upright with a lid. It has a plow disk (with handles so that it can be lifted off to dump out the coal) on the bottom so the heat from the flames does not melt the bottom of the barrel. It has a hole on the top so some of the smoke leaves the barrel and so that the flames do not go out altogether.

It has 3 to 4 slots on each side of the barrel so the ½” stainless steel round rods can sit on the barrel without falling in and it is where the meat hangs on the hooks. The hooks are ⅛” stainless steel rounds that are bent in an “S”-like shape so the meat does not fall into the coals.

Some can be purchased at online retail stores pre-made.

Function 

A barrel barbecue works like a smoker barbecue where the meat hangs suspended from hooks and smokes for 2 to 3 hours. Because the lid is removed as little as possible during cooking, the extent of cooking is monitored using a remote control thermometer to measure the internal temperature of the meat. 

The barrel is set in the dirt or cement so the grass does not catch fire. Coals are put in the bottom of the barrel along with some lighter fluid in and then ignited with a piece of paper that has a small flame on it. The flame is allowed to die down a bit before putting the meat on.

Gallery

See also 
 Beverage can stove
 İzmir İstanbul Ankara Ambar taşıma

Barbecue